Dark Passion Play World Tour was the fourth world tour by Finnish symphonic metal band Nightwish, taking place from 2007 to 2009 in support of their sixth studio album, Dark Passion Play, released by Nuclear Blast on September 26, 2007; it was the first tour with former frontwoman Anette Olzon, who joined the band in 2006, after Tarja Turunen's dismissal on October 21, 2005. During this tour, the band played for the first time in Israel, China, Hong Kong, Lithuania, Luxembourg, Republic of Ireland, Serbia and Croatia.

On September 22, 2007, the band hosted a secret concert at Rock Café in Tallinn, Estonia, disguising itself as a Nightwish cover band called "Nachtwasser". Their first official concert with the new singer was in Tel Aviv, Israel on October 6, 2007. The tour thus started, visiting the United States, Canada, most of Europe, Asia, and Australia. In 2008, the band played over 100 shows, with concerts in Oceania, Europe and Asia. In November, the band played in South America, and later took a three-month break; Nightwish started the third leg in 2009, with dates in North America and Europe, and also attended various summer festivals, including Graspop Metal Meeting and Masters of Rock. The last show was played at Helsinki Hartwall Areena, with an attendance of 11,000 people.

For their Once album, Nightwish had planned to give a grand concert in London with a live orchestra, as the progressive metal band Dream Theater had done on what later would be their Score album, and this project is still in the works. In an interview in December 2007, Holopainen said that they have been planning the concert and that this was something he really wanted to do, but that the locale they needed was already booked for two years in advance. The show was never played though, but according to Holopainen it is still in the future plans for other tours.

Setlist

Dispelling the rumours that Anette Olzon would never be capable of performing old Nightwish hit songs, the band used a setlist containing songs from all their album, except for Angels Fall First and the Over the Hills and Far Away EP He was not afraid that Olzon would not be able to perform the songs that Turunen usually sang, because even on her demo she showed her ability performing for example "Ever Dream" and "Higher Than Hope", but he has confirmed that they will never again play songs "The Phantom of the Opera", "Passion and the Opera" and "Stargazers", as these go beyond Olzon's non-operatic vocal style. Despite this, the former and the latter were brought back when Floor Jansen joined the band in 2012.

The ballad "Eva" was performed only a few times in the tour, as well as "Sleeping Sun", while "Cadence of Her Last Breath" and "She Is My Sin" haven't been performed since the 2008 concerts in Australia. During the 2008 European leg, "Slaying the Dreamer" and "She Is My Sin" were performed in selected dates while "Dead to the World" and "The Siren" were included in the usual setlist, remaining until the end of the tour. During this European leg, the Irish musician Troy Donockley joined the band on stage to play Uilleann pipes on "The Islander" and "Last of the Wilds", and the native-American singer John Two-Hawks joined the band in a few dates to sing and play flute on "Stone People" and "Creek Mary's Blood". Also during the European leg the band started to play a version of Megadeth's Symphony of Destruction, occasionally replaced by the original "While Your Lips Are Still Red", both featuring Marko Hietala on led vocals. In the second North American leg in 2008 the band brought back their "Come Cover Me" song, played until the end of the Latin American tour in November.

Some old songs like "Dead Boy's Poem", "Romanticide" and "Ghost Love Score" have only been performed by the band since in the 2009 tour dates, starting in London's Brixton Academy on March 11, and Olzon has performed "Kuolema tekee taiteilijan" without the support of the band during a festival in Sweden. Holopainen has also revealed that the band rehearsed Elvenpath with Olzon, but that the song "didn't work" well enough to be performed live. The final concert at Hartwall Areena in Helsinki featured the previously never performed song "Meadows of Heaven", also including an acoustic version of "Walking in the Air" and the unreleased cover of "The Heart Asks Pleasure First" recorded for Dark Passion Play was also played while the band left the stage.

Tour dates

Cancelled dates

Personnel

 Anette Olzon – female vocals
 Tuomas Holopainen – keyboards
 Emppu Vuorinen – guitars
 Jukka Nevalainen – drums
 Marko Hietala – bass, male vocals

Guest musicians
 Troy Donockley – bagpipes (UK and 2009 shows)
 John Two-Hawks – male vocals and flute (shows in Louisville, Mokena and Sauget)
 Pekka Kuusisto – violin (Hartwall Areena only)

References

External links
Nightwish's Official Website

2007 concert tours
2008 concert tours
2009 concert tours
Nightwish concert tours